The Ne'er-Do-Well is a 1916 American silent adventure crime drama film directed by Colin Campbell, and starring Wheeler Oakman, Kathlyn Williams, Harry Lonsdale, Frank Clark, and Norma Nichols. It is based on the 1911 novel of the same name by Rex Beach. The film was released by V-L-S-E, Incorporated on March 20, 1916.

Another film adaptation was later released in 1923, in which Sidney Smith reprised the role as he did in the 1916 version.

Plot

Cast
Wheeler Oakman as Kirk Anthony, the Ne're-Do-Well
Kathlyn Williams as Mrs. Edith Cortlandt, a Diplomat
Harry Lonsdale as Stephen Cortlandt, Her Husband
Frank Clark as Darwin K. Anthony, Railroad Magnate
Norma Nichols as Chiquita Garavel, A Spanish Maiden
Will Machin as Weller, alias Locke
Jack McDonald as Allan Allan, an English Subject
Sidney Smith as Ramon Alfarez, Commondant of Police
Fred Huntley as Andres Garavel
Lamar Johnstone as Runnels
Harry De Vere as Detective Williams

Preservation
A print of the film survives at the Library of Congress.

References

External links

1910s adventure drama films
1916 crime drama films
American adventure drama films
American crime drama films
1916 films
American silent feature films
American black-and-white films
Films based on American novels
Films based on works by Rex Beach
Films directed by Colin Campbell
1910s American films
Silent American drama films
Silent adventure films